The Stranger is a 1918 American silent comedy film featuring Oliver Hardy. Prints of this film survive in private collections and it has been released on DVD.

Cast
 Billy West as The Prospector
 Leatrice Joy as Susie
 Bud Ross as Susie's Father (credited as Budd Ross)
 Oliver Hardy as Oliver, the saloonkeeper
 Leo White as The Greaser

Reception
Like many American films of the time, The Stranger was subject to cuts by city and state film censorship boards. For example, the Chicago Board of Censors cut, in Reel 2, the intertitle "The Hall of Joy where wine, women and song hold forth temptations to strangers".

See also
 List of American films of 1918
 Oliver Hardy filmography

References

External links

1918 films
1918 comedy films
1918 short films
American silent short films
American black-and-white films
Films directed by Arvid E. Gillstrom
Silent American comedy films
American comedy short films
1910s American films